The 1994 Tour de Suisse was the 58th edition of the Tour de Suisse cycle race and was held from 14 June to 23 June 1994. The race started in Yverdon-les-Bains and finished in Zürich. The race was won by Pascal Richard of the GB–MG Maglificio team.

General classification

References

1994
Tour de Suisse